Shane Nelson (born November 29, 1984) is an American mixed martial artist. He was a cast member of SpikeTV's The Ultimate Fighter: Team Nogueira vs. Team Mir. In addition to the UFC, Nelson has also competed for the MFC, Shooto, and Shark Fights.

Mixed martial arts career
For the last six years, Nelson has trained with former UFC Lightweight Champion B.J. Penn. Nelson has worked in construction, and now trains full-time with Troy Mandaloniz and Kendall Grove.

The Ultimate Fighter
Nelson  earned a spot in the house by defeating Charles Diaz via decision after two rounds. Later on, the fighters were given the opportunity to watch UFC 84 on TV. While watching, Junie Browning and Shane began drinking. The pair soon became belligerent and started to throw things into the pool and attempted to pick fights with the other fighters. The next day, UFC President Dana White came to the house and expressed his displeasure with the Nelson and Browning's actions. He announced his decision to give them a second chance and did not kick them off of the show. White then spoke to the coaches to ensure that Nelson would be in the first Lightweight fight. Efrain Escudero defeated Shane in the second round with a head triangle.

Ultimate Fighting Championship
Nelson won his UFC debut against former The Ultimate Fighter: Team Nogueira vs. Team Mir castmate George Roop. Nelson won the fight via split decision.

Nelson had his second fight in the UFC defeating Aaron Riley at UFC 96, Nelson won via TKO 44 seconds into the first round. The stoppage is being called one of the worst in UFC history. Nelson was later defeated by Riley via unanimous decision in a rematch at UFC 101.

Nelson was released from the UFC after losing to Matt Wiman via unanimous decision at UFC 107.

DREAM
Nelson was set to fight Shinya Aoki on very short notice at DREAM. Fight for Japan!. However, Aoki declined to fight Nelson, and he was replaced by Rich Clementi.

Personal life
Nelson has a son.

Mixed martial arts record

|-
| Win
| align=center| 16–7
| Kaleo Kwan
| Decision (majority)
| RWE - Just Scrap
| 
| align=center| 3
| align=center| 5:00
| Hilo, Hawaii, United States
| 
|-
| Loss
| align=center| 15–7
| Graham Spencer
| Decision (unanimous)
| MFC 35
| 
| align=center| 3
| align=center| 5:00
| Edmonton, Alberta, Canada
| 
|-
| Loss
| align=center| 15–6
| Takasuke Kume
| Submission (rear-naked choke)
| Shooto: Gig Central 24: Love and Courage
| 
| align=center| 2
| align=center| 1:54
| Nagoya, Aichi, Japan
| 
|-
| Win
| align=center| 15–5
| Lance Wipf
| TKO (injury)
| Superior Cage Combat 3
| 
| align=center| 2
| align=center| 2:15
| Las Vegas, Nevada, United States
| 
|-
| Win
| align=center| 14–5
| Aaron Wetherspoon
| TKO (doctor stoppage)
| Shark Fights 18
| 
| align=center| 2
| align=center| 1:33
| Sparks, Nevada, United States
| 
|-
| Win
| align=center| 13–5
| Jai Bradney
| Submission (guillotine choke)
| Nitro 2: Throwdown
| 
| align=center| 2
| align=center| 2:06
| Logan City, Queensland, Australia
| 
|-
| Loss
| align=center| 12–5
| Matt Wiman
| Decision (unanimous)
| UFC 107
| 
| align=center| 3
| align=center| 5:00
| Memphis, Tennessee, United States
| 
|-
| Loss
| align=center| 12–4
| Aaron Riley
| Decision (unanimous)
| UFC 101
| 
| align=center| 3
| align=center| 5:00
| Philadelphia, Pennsylvania, United States
| 
|-
| Win
| align=center| 12–3
| Aaron Riley
| TKO (punch)
| UFC 96
| 
| align=center| 1
| align=center| 0:44
| Columbus, Ohio, United States
| 
|-
| Win
| align=center| 11–3
| George Roop
| Decision (split)
| TUF 8 Finale
| 
| align=center| 3
| align=center| 5:00
| Las Vegas, Nevada, United States
| 
|-
| Win
| align=center| 10–3
| Kaleo Kwan
| Decision (split)
| X-1 Events: Champions
| 
| align=center| 3
| align=center| 5:00
| Honolulu, Hawaii, United States
| 
|-
| Win
| align=center| 9–3
| Harris Sarmiento
| Decision (unanimous)
| Gracie Proving Ground
| 
| align=center| 3
| align=center| 5:00
| Honolulu, Hawaii, United States
| 
|-
| Win
| align=center| 8–3
| Mike Cuban
| TKO (strikes)
| Rumbling on the Rocks: Beatdown 4
| 
| align=center| 1
| align=center| N/A
| Hawaii, United States
| 
|-
| Win
| align=center| 7–3
| Kolo Koka
| Decision (unanimous)
| X-1: Extreme Fighting 2
| 
| align=center| 3
| align=center| 5:00
| Honolulu, Hawaii, United States
| 
|-
| Win
| align=center| 6–3
| Aleka Rincon
| Decision (unanimous)
| Rumbling on the Rocks: Beatdown 2
| 
| align=center| 3
| align=center| 5:00
| Hilo, Hawaii, United States
| 
|-
| Win
| align=center| 5–3
| Tyler Kahihikolo
| Decision (unanimous)
| Rumbling on the Rocks: Beatdown 1
| 
| align=center| 3
| align=center| 5:00
| Hawaii, United States
| 
|-
| Loss
| align=center| 4–3
| Jamal Perkins
| Decision (unanimous)
| Extreme Wars 2: X-1
| 
| align=center| 3
| align=center| 3:00
| Honolulu, Hawaii, United States
| 
|-
| Win
| align=center| 4–2
| Isaac Kuikahi
| Submission (choke)
| Rumbling on the Rocks: Just Scrap
| 
| align=center| 1
| align=center| 3:09
| Hilo, Hawaii, United States
| 
|-
| Loss
| align=center| 3–2
| Robert Villapondo
| Decision (majority)
| Rumbling on the Rocks: Showdown in Maui
| 
| align=center| 2
| align=center| 5:00
| Maui, Hawaii, United States
| 
|-
| Loss
| align=center| 3–1
| Harris Sarmiento
| Decision (unanimous)
| Rumbling on the Rocks: Proving Grounds II
| 
| align=center| 2
| align=center| 5:00
| Hilo, Hawaii, United States
| 
|-
| Win
| align=center| 3–0
| Kaleo Kwan
| Decision (majority)
| Punishment in Paradise 9
| 
| align=center| 2
| align=center| 5:00
| Hawaii, United States
| 
|-
| Win
| align=center| 2–0
| Duke Sarigosa
| Submission (strikes)
| Rumbling on the Rocks: Proving Grounds I
| 
| align=center| 1
| align=center| N/A
| Kona, Hawaii, United States
| 
|-
| Win
| align=center| 1–0
| Wayne Salazar
| Submission (guillotine choke)
| You Think You're Tough 5
| 
| align=center| 1
| align=center| 2:29
| Kona, Hawaii, United States
|

References

External links

1984 births
Living people
American male mixed martial artists
Mixed martial artists from Hawaii
Lightweight mixed martial artists
Mixed martial artists utilizing Brazilian jiu-jitsu
American practitioners of Brazilian jiu-jitsu
Ultimate Fighting Championship male fighters